This is a list of films produced in Sweden and in the Swedish language in the 1970s. For an A-Z see :Category:Swedish films.

1970

1971

1972

1973

1974

1975

1976

1977

1978

1979

External links
 Swedish film at the Internet Movie Database

1970s
Swedish
Films

nl:Lijst van Zweedse films
zh:瑞典電影列表